During the 2007–08 German football season, 1. FC Kaiserslautern competed in the 2. Bundesliga.

Season summary
Kjetil Rekdal was sacked as manager in February with Kaiserslautern in 16th place with only 3 wins from their first 19 games. Milan Šašić, who had taken TuS Koblenz from the fourth tier to midtable in the second tier, was appointed as his successor and secured safety on the final day of the season with victory over already promoted 1. FC Köln. However, this represented Kaiserslautern's worst finish in the German league pyramid since the formation of the Bundesliga in 1963.

Players

First-team squad
Squad at end of season

Left club during season

Competitions

2. Bundesliga

League table

References

Notes

1. FC Kaiserslautern seasons
German football clubs 2007–08 season